The Paganini Competition (aka Premio Paganini or Paganini Concore) is an international violin competition named after the famed virtuoso and founder of contemporary violin technique Niccolò Paganini. Created in 1954 it has been carried out ever since in the months of September and October. The "Paganini Competition" is one of the most important violin competitions. It is held every two years at "Carlo Felice" theatre in Genoa, Italy. There are three levels of competition: preliminaries, semi-finals, and finals and repertoire that is played includes solo violin, violin and piano accompaniment, and violin and orchestra.

Participation
Participants are of all nationalities and are between 15 and 31 years of age.

Competition
Preliminaries: Preliminary repertoire includes two selections for solo violin or violin and piano accompaniment and two Caprices from Paganini's 24 Caprices, Op.1 M.S. 25 for solo violin.

Semi-Finals: Three or four selections for solo violin or violin and piano, one virtuoso piece by Paganini, and one contemporary piece.

Finals: Two pieces with orchestra that may be a whole concerto or part of a concerto. One of the two pieces is always by Paganini.

The Judges
There are eight judges. They are all musicians, usually violinists, but sometimes composers, conductors, or other musicians.

Controversy ensued prior to the 2018 competition when, in February 2018, Fabio Luisi resigned as chairman of the competition, in protest at his perceived imposition of judges by the Italian cultural official Elisa Serafini.

Award
Six musicians place, though occasionally seven have been awarded the prize. Since 1989 special placement has been awarded. It is no longer possible to be joint winners. The player selected by the judges, however, will be given the honor of playing one of Paganini's violins and one of the most known violin owned by Paganini, the Il Cannone made by Guarneri 'Del Gesu', and is often offered recording contracts.

Special awards
Prize in memory of Dr. Enrico Costa: Offered by the Costa Family to the youngest participant admitted to the Final.
Prize in memory of the Renato De Barbieri: Offered by the Government of the Province of Genoa to one of the finalists for the best interpretation of Paganini’s Capricci within the Preliminary and Semifinal Stages.
Prize of the Association Amici di Paganini: Offered by the Association for the finest performance of the Paganini Concerto.
Prize in memory of Mario Ruminelli: Offered by the Ruminelli Family to the best placed finalist
Friends of the Nuovo Carlo Felice Association prize: Offered for the best performance of the commissioned work.

Winners

Breakdown of winners and finalists by nationality

Highest number of prizes held (minimum 3)
 Giovanni Angeleri (Italy) 7 prizes
 Eijin Nimura (Japan) 5 prizes
 Yuki Manuela Janke (Germania/Japan) 4 prizes
 Jean-Pierre Wallez (France) 4 prizes
 In Mo Yang (South Korea) 4 prizes
 Ilya Gringolts (Russia) 3 prizes
 Mengla Huang (China) 3 prizes
 Stephanie Jeong (US) 3 prizes
 Dami Kim (South Korea) 3 prizes
 Feng Ning (China) 3 prizes
 Mariusz Patyra (Poland) 3 prizes
 Gabriele Pieranunzi (Italy) 3 prizes
 Sayaka Shoji (Japan) 3 prizes
 Reiko Watanabe (Japan) 3 prizes

Past prize-winners

I Edition - 1954

not assigned

II Edition - 1955
 1st Prize: not assigned
 2nd Prize: not assigned
 3rd Prize: Luciano Vicari (Italy)
 4th Prize : Liliane Beretti (France) and Jean Louis Stuurop (Netherlands)

III Edition - 1956
 1st Prize : György Pauk (Hungary) and Gérard Poulet (France)
 2nd Prize: not assigned
 3rd Prize: not assigned
 4th Prize : Carmencita Lozada (Philippine), Luciano Vicari (Italy) and Jean-Pierre Wallez (France)

IV Edition - 1957
 1st Prize: not assigned
 2nd Prize : Salvatore Accardo (Italy) and Pierre Doukan (France)
 4th Prize: Jean-Pierre Wallez (France)
 5th Prize: not assigned

V Edition - 1958
 1st Prize: Salvatore Accardo (Italy)
 2nd Prize: Jean-Pierre Wallez (France)

VI Edition - 1959
 1st Prize: Stuart Canin (US)
 2nd Prize: Saschko Gawriloff (Germany)
 3rd Prize: Liliane Caillon (France)
 4th Prize: Catherine Courtois (France)
 5th Prize: Eleonora Dell'Aquila (Italy)
 6th Prize: Johannes Brüning (Germany)

VII Edition - 1960
 1st Prize: not assigned
 2nd Prize : Jean-Pierre Wallez (France) and Yossef Zivoni (Israel)
 4th Prize: Gigino Maestri (Italy)
 6th Prize: Josef Sivo (Austria)

VIII Edition - 1961
 1st Prize:  (Bulgaria) 
 2nd Prize : Elaine Skorodin (US) and Carmencita Lozada (Philippines)
 4th Prize : Bice Antonioni (Italy) and Paulette Bedin (France)

IX Edition - 1962
 1st Prize: Maryvonne The Dizes (France)
 2nd Prize: Etsuko Hirose (Japan)
 3rd Prize: Liliane Caillon (France)
 4th Prize: Marilyn Dubow (US)

X Edition - 1963
 1st Prize: Oleh Krysa (USSR)
 2nd Prize: Valentin Zuk (USSR)
 3rd Prize: Shizuko Ishii (Japan)
 4th Prize: Paul Zukofsky (US)
 5th Prize: Diana Cummings (Great Britain)
 6th Prize: Igor Politkovsky (USSR)

XI Edition - 1964
 1st Prize: Jean-Jacques Kantorow (France)
 2nd Prize : Pierre Amoyal (France) and Yoko Kubo (Japan)
 4th Prize : Hisako Tokue (Japan) and Tomotada Soh (Japan)
 6th Prize: Antoine Goulard (France)

XII Edition - 1965
 1st Prize: Viktor Pikaizen (USSR)
 2nd Prize: Philippe Hirschhorn (USSR)
 3rd Prize: Andrei Korsakov (USSR)
 4th Prize: Yoko Kubo (Japan)
 5th Prize : Elisabeth Balmas (France), Joshua Epstein (Israel) and Jacques Israelievitch (France)

XIII Edition - 1966
 1st Prize: not assigned
 2nd Prize: Robert Menga (US)
 3rd Prize: Isako Shinozaki (Japan)
 5th Prize : Nicolai Marangosof (Bulgaria) and Kineko Okumura (Japan)

XIV Edition - 1967
 1st Prize: Grigori Zhislin (USSR)
 2nd Prize: Vladimir Spivakov (USSR)
 3rd Prize: Patrice Fontanarosa (France)
 4th Prize: Petar Delcev (Bulgaria)
 5th Prize: Sergio Diacenko (USSR)
 6th Prize: Mikhail Gantwarg (USSR)

XV Edition - 1968
 1st Prize: Miriam Fried (Israel) 
 2nd Prize: Hamao Fujiwara (Japan)
 3rd Prize: Gabriella Ijac (Romania)
 4th Prize: Petar Delcev (Bulgaria)
 5th Prize: Masako Yanagita (Japan)
 6th Prize: Emmanuel Krivine (France)

XVI Edition - 1969
 1st Prize: Gidon Kremer (USSR)
 2nd Prize: Kathleen Lenski (US)
 3rd Prize: Joshua Epstein (Israel)
 4th Prize: Isidora Schwarzberg (USSR)
 5th Prize: Sergey Kravchenko (USSR)
 6th Prize: Josef Rissin (USSR)
 7th Prize: Adam Korniszewski (Poland)

XVII Edition - 1970
 1st Prize: not assigned
 2nd Prize: Mintcho Mintchev (Bulgaria)
 3rd Prize: Thomas Goldschmidt Egel (Germany) and Michał Grabarczyk (Poland)
 5th Prize: Adam Korniszewski (Poland)
 6th Prize: Keiko Wataya (Japan)

XVIII Edition - 1971
 1st Prize: Mose Sekler (USSR)
 2nd Prize: Bogodar Kotorovych (USSR)
 3rd Prize: Roswitha Randacher (Austria)
 4th Prize: Tadeusz Gadzina (Poland)
 5th Prize: Elvira Nakipbecova (USSR)
 6th Prize: Maria Balint (Hungary)

XIX Edition - 1972
 1st Prize: Eugene Fodor (US)
 2nd Prize: Yoko Sato (Japan)
 3rd Prize: Gerardo Ribeiro (Portugal)
 4th Prize: Georgi Tilev (Bulgaria)
 5th Prize: Teresa Glabowna (Poland)

XX Edition - 1973
 1st Prize: Alexander Kramarov (USSR)
 2nd Prize: Yuval Yaron (Israel)
 3rd Prize: Vania Milanova (Bulgaria)
 4th Prize: Sungil Lee (Korea)
 5th Prize: Giuliano Carmignola (Italy) and Stefan Stalanowski (Poland)

XXI Edition - 1974
 1st Prize: not assigned
 2nd Prize: Lynn Chang (US) and Eugen Sârbu (Romania)
 4th Prize: Rasma Lielmane (Mexico)
 5th Prize: Josif Rissin (Israel)
 6th Prize: Jean-Claude Velin (France)
 7th Prize: Marie-France Pouillot (France)

XXII Edition - 1975
 1st Prize: Yuri Korchinski (USSR)
 2nd Prize: Petru Csaba (Romania)
 6th Prize : Mark Fornaciari (Italy) and Anna Aleksandra Wodka (Poland)

XXIII Edition - 1976
 1st Prize: Lenuța Ciulei (Romania)
 2nd Prize: Karen Eley (US)
 3rd Prize: Vladimir Nemțeanu (Romania)
 4th Prize: Fudeko Takahashi (Japan)
 5th Prize: Joanna Madroszkiewicz (Poland)

XXIV Edition - 1977
 1st Prize: Ilya Grubert (USSR)
 2nd Prize: Sachiko Nakajima (Japan)
 3rd Prize: Yumi Mohri (Japan)
 4th Prize: Edward Zienkowski (Poland)
 5th Prize: Alexey Bruni (USSR)
 6th Prize: Ola Rudner (Sweden)

XXV Edition - 1978
 1st Prize: Eugen Sârbu (Romania)
 2nd Prize : Karen Eley (US) and Piotr Milewski (Poland)
 4th Prize: Takashi Shimitzu (Japan)
 5th Prize: Berthilde Dufour (France)
 6th Prize: Daniel Stabrawa (Poland)

XXVI Edition - 1979
 1st Prize: Florin Paul (Romania)
 2nd Prize: Yuriko Naganuma (Japan)
 3rd Prize: Alexis Galpérine (France)
 4th Prize: Mariko Senju (Japan)
 5th Prize: Rodolfo Bonucci (Italy)

XXVII Edition - 1980
 1st Prize: not assigned
 2nd Prize: Niculae Tudor (Romania)
 3rd Prize: Sonig Tchakerian (Italy)
 4th Prize: Eduard Wulfson (USSR)
 5th Prize: Mitsuko Ishii (Japan)
 6th Prize : Daniel Stabrawa (Poland) and Walter Bertrand (France)

XXVIII Edition - 1981
 1st Prize: Ilja Kaler (USSR)
 2nd Prize: Leonid Sorokov (USSR)
 3rd Prize: Frank Almond (US)
 4th Prize: Kuniko Nagata (Japan)
 5th Prize: Mircea Călin (Romania)
 6th Prize: Francine Trachier (France)

XXIX Edition - 1982
 1st Prize: not assigned
 2nd Prize : Alexander Markov (US) and Boris Garlitsky (USSR)
 3rd Prize: Sonoko Numata (Japan)
 4th Prize : Philippe Djokic (France-US), Maxim Fedotov (USSR) and Hiroko Suzuki (Japan)

XXX Edition - 1983
 1st Prize: not assigned
 2nd Prize: Laurent Korcia (France)
 3rd Prize: Sung-Sic Yang (Korea)
 4th Prize: Reiko Watanabe (Japan)
 5th Prize: Boris Schmitz (Germany)
 6th Prize: Soon-Ik Lee (Korea) and Kazimierz Olechowski (Poland)

XXXI Edition - 1984
 1st Prize: not assigned
 2nd Prize: Vadim Brodski (USSR)
 3rd Prize: Reiko Watanabe (Japan)
 4th Prize: Elisa Kawaguti (Japan)
 5th Prize: Stéphane Tran Ngoc (France)

XXXII Edition - 1985
 1st Prize: Dmitri Berlinsky  (USSR)
 2nd Prize: Mark Moghilevski (USSR)
 3rd Prize: Gabriel Croitoru (Romania)
 4th Prize : Anguelina Abadjieva (Bulgaria) and Anton Kholodenko (USSR)
 6th Prize: Thomas Böttcher (East Germany)

XXXIII Edition - 1986
 1st Prize: not assigned
 2nd Prize: Reiko Watanabe (Japan)
 3rd Prize: Yuri Braginski (Belgium)
 4th Prize: Andreas Krecher (Germany)
 5th Prize: Akiko Ueda (Japan)
 6th Prize: Jeanne-Marie Conquer (France)

XXXIV Edition - 1987
 1st Prize: Lu Siqing (China)
 2nd Prize: Pavel Berman (USSR)
 3rd Prize: Alexei Koshvanets (USSR)
 4th Prize : Adam Taubic (Poland) and Vincenzo Bolognese (Italy)
 6th Prize: Viktor Kuznetsov (USSR)

XXXV Edition - 1988
 1st Prize: Leonidas Kavakos (Greece)
 2nd Prize: Akiko Suwanai (Japan)
 3rd Prize: Eijin Nimura (Japan)
 4th Prize: Gabriele Pieranunzi (Italy)
 5th Prize: Pavel Pekarsky (US)
 6th Prize: Ara Malikian (Lebanon/Spain)

XXXVI Edition - 1989
 1st Prize: not assigned
 2nd Prize: Vasko Vassilev (Bulgaria)
 3rd Prize: Oleg Pokhanovski (USSR)
 4th Prize: Anastasia Chebotareva (USSR)
 5th Prize: Tomoko Kawada (Japan)
 6th Prize: Ilja Sekler (USSR) and Eijin Nimura (Japan)
 Prize in memory of Dr. Enrico Costa: Luca Fanfoni (Italy)

XXXVII Edition - 1990
 1st Prize: Natalia Prischepenko (USSR)
 2nd Prize: Chin Kim (US)
 3rd Prize: Gabriele Pieranunzi (Italy)
 4th Prize: Graf Mourja (USSR)
 5th Prize: Roberto Cani (Italy)
 6th Prize: Alexander Trostianski (USSR)
 Prize in memory of Dr. Enrico Costa: Gabriele Pieranunzi

XXXVIII Edition - 1991
 1st Prize: Massimo Quarta (Italy)
 2nd Prize: Florin Croitoru (Romania)
 3rd Prize : Nicolas Gourbeix (France) and Misha Keylin (US)
 5th Prize: Yumi Makita (Japan)
 6th Prize: Ko-Woon Yang (Korea)
 Prize in memory of Dr. Enrico Costa: Massimo Quarta

XXXIX Edition - 1992
 1st Prize: Julia Krasko (Russia)
 2nd Prize: Michiko Kamiya (Japan)
 3rd Prize: Eijin Nimura (Japan)
 4th Prize : Giovanni Angeleri (Italy) and Karen Lee (US)
 5th Prize: Ara Malikian (Armenia)
 Prize in memory of Dr. Enrico Costa: Giovanni Angeleri

XL Edition - 1993
 1st Prize: Isabelle Faust (Germany)
 2nd Prize: Stefan Milenkovic (FR Yugoslavia)
 3rd Prize: Yuka Eguchi (Japan)
 4th Prize: Florin Ionescu-Galaţi (Romania)
 5th Prize: Eijin Nimura (Japan)
 6th Prize: Giovanni Angeleri (Italy)
 Prize in memory of Dr. Enrico Costa: Giovanni Angeleri
 Prize in memory of Renato De Barbieri: Rachel Barton (US)

XLI Edition - 1994
 1st Prize: Bin Huang (China)
 2nd Prize: Eijin Nimura (Japan)
 3rd Prize: Dmitri Makhtine (Russia)
 4th Prize: Stefan Milenković (FR Yugoslavia)
 5th Prize: Giovanni Angeleri (Italy)
 6th Prize: Giacobbe Stevanato (Italy)
 Prize in memory of Dr. Enrico Costa: Giovanni Angeleri
 Prize in memory of Renato De Barbieri: Bin Huang
 Friends of the Nuovo Carlo Felice Association prize: Aki Sunahara (Japan) and Giordan Nikolitch (Slovenia)

XLII Edition - 1995
 1st Prize: not assigned
 2nd Prize: Alexandru Tomescu (Romania)
 3rd Prize: Oleg Pokhanovski (Russia)
 4th Prize: Leor Maltinski (Israel)
 5th Prize: Stefan Schramm (Germany)
 6th Prize: Antonello Manacorda (Italy)
 Special prize of the Giuria: Anastasia Khitruk (US)
 Prize in memory of Dr. Enrico Costa: Leor Maltinski
 Friends of the Nuovo Carlo Felice Association prize: Stefan Schramm

XLIII Edition - 1996
 1st Prize: Soovin Kim (US)
 2nd Prize: Andrew Haveron (Great Britain)
 3rd Prize: Ju-Young Baek (Korea)
 4th Prize: Sergei Levitin (Russia)
 5th Prize: Florin Croitoru (Romania)
 6th Prize: Jasmine Lin (US)
 Prize in memory of Dr. Enrico Costa: Soovin Kim
 Prize in memory of Renato De Barbieri: Sergei Levitin
 Friends of the Nuovo Carlo Felice Association prize: Andrew Haveron

XLIV Edition - 1997
 1st Prize: Giovanni Angeleri (Italy)
 2nd Prize: Rodion Petrov (Russia)
 3rd Prize: Judith Ingolfsson (Iceland)
 4th Prize: Kyoko Yonemoto (Japan)
 5th Prize: Hanako Uesato (Japan)
 6th Prize: Maki Nagata (Japan)
 Prize in memory of Dr. Enrico Costa: Kyoko Yonemoto
 Prize in memory of Renato De Barbieri: Rodion Petrov
 Friends of the Nuovo Carlo Felice Association prize: Laura Andriani (Italy)

XLV Edition - 1998
 1st Prize: Ilya Gringolts (Russia)
 2nd Prize: Baiba Skride (Latvia)
 3rd Prize: Takako Yamasaki (Japan)
 4th Prize: Michael Vitenson (Israel)
 5th Prize: Anton Polezhayev (US)
 6th Prize: Maki Itoi (Japan)
 Prize in memory of Dr. Enrico Costa: Ilya Gringolts
 Prize in memory of Renato De Barbieri: Maciko Shimada (Japan)
 Friends of the Nuovo Carlo Felice Association prize: Ilya Gringolts

XLVI Edition - 1999
 1st Prize: Sayaka Shoji (Japan)
 2nd Prize: Frank Huang (China)
 3rd Prize: Akiko Ono (Japan)
 4th Prize: Weiyi Wang (China)
 5th Prize: Emil Chudnovsky (US)
 6th Prize: Gabriel Adorjan (Denmark)
 Prize in memory of Dr. Enrico Costa: Sayaka Shoji
 Prize in memory of Mario Ruminelli: Sayaka Shoji
 Friends of the Nuovo Carlo Felice Association prize: Francesco Manara (Italy)

XLVII Edition - 2000
 1st Prize: Natalia Lomeiko (New Zelanda/Russia)
 2nd Prize: Sayako Kusaka (Japan)
 3rd Prize : Karin Ato (Japan) and Vadim Tchijik (Russia)
 5th Prize: Sophie Moser (Germany)
 6th Prize: Myroslava Ivanchenko (Ukraine)
 Prize in memory of Dr. Enrico Costa: Sophie Moser
 Prize in memory of Renato De Barbieri: Sayako Kusaka
 Prize in memory of the Mario Ruminelli: Natalia Lomeiko
 Friends of the Nuovo Carlo Felice Association prize: Vadim Tchijik

XLVIII Edition - 2001
 1st Prize: Mariusz Patyra (Poland)
 2nd Prize: Minjae Kim (South Korea)
 3rd Prize: Tanja Becker-Bender (Germany)
 4th Prize: Jack Liebeck (Great Britain)
 5th Prize: A-Rah Shin (South Korea)
 6th Prize: Gyula Vadászi (Hungary)
 Prize in memory of Dr. Enrico Costa: A-Rah Shin
 Prize in memory of Renato De Barbieri: Mariusz Patyra 
 Prize in memory of the Mario Ruminelli: Mariusz Patyra
 Friends of the Nuovo Carlo Felice Association prize: Tanja Becker-Bender

IL Edition - 2002
 1st Prize: Mengla Huang (China)
 2nd Prize: Maxim Brylinski (Ukraine)
 3rd Prize: Daniel Roehn (Germany-Sweden)
 4th Prize : Emil Chudnovski (US) and Giulio Plotino (Italy)
 6th Prize: Kyoko Une (Japan)
 Prize in memory of Dr. Enrico Costa: Maxim Brylinski
 Prize in memory of Renato De Barbieri: Mengla Huang
 Prize in memory of the Mario Ruminelli: Mengla Huang
 Friends of the Nuovo Carlo Felice Association prize: Alexis Cardenas (Venezuela)

L Edition - 2004
 1st Prize: Maria Machowska>
 2nd Prize: Yuki Manuela Janke (Germany/Japan)
 3rd Prize: Hyun Soo Shin (South Korea)
 4th Prize: Dalibor Karvay (Slovakia)
 5th Prize: Bracha Malkin (US/Israel)
 6th Prize: Diego Tosi (France)
 Prize in memory of Renato De Barbieri: Alicia N Evans
 Prize in memory of Dr. Enrico Costa: Alicia N Evans
 Prize in memory of the Mario Ruminelli: Yuki Manuela Janke
 Friends of the Nuovo Carlo Felice Association prize: Yuki Manuela Janke

LI Edition - 2006
 1st Prize: Feng Ning (China)
 2nd Prize: Yura Lee (South Korea)
 3rd Prize: Rika Masato (Japan)
 Finalists: Hyun Joo Choo (South Korea), Bo-Kyung Lee (South Korea), Sergey Malov (Russia)
 Prize in memory of Dr. Enrico Costa: Hyun Joo Choo
 Prize in memory of the Renato De Barbieri: Feng Ning 
 Prize in memory of Mario Ruminelli: Sergey Malov
 Friends of the Nuovo Carlo Felice Association prize: Feng Ning

LII Edition - 2008
 1st Prize: not assigned
 2nd Prize: Stephanie Jeong (US)
 3rd Prize: Sean Lee (US)>
 Finalists: Francesca Dego (Italy), Evgeny Sviridov (Russia)
 Prize in memory of Dr. Enrico Costa: Francesca Dego
 Prize in memory of Renato De Barbieri: Sviridov
 Friends of Paganini Association Prize: Stephanie Jeong
 Prize in memory of Mario Ruminelli: Stephanie Jeong
 Friends of the Nuovo Carlo Felice Association prize: Sviridov

LIII Edition - 2010
 1st Prize: not assigned
 2nd Prize: Dami Kim (South Korea)
 3rd Prize: Stefan Tarara (Germany)
 Finalists: Yu-Chien Tseng 曾宇謙(Taiwan), Fedor Rudin (France)
 Prize in memory of Dr. Enrico Costa: Yu-Chien Tseng 曾宇謙
 Friends of Paganini Association Prize: Yu-Chien Tseng 曾宇謙
 Prize in memory of Mario Ruminelli: Dami Kim
 Prize in memory of Renato De Barbieri: Dami Kim
 Friends of the Nuovo Carlo Felice Association prize: Stefan Tarara

LIV Edition - 2015
 1st Prize: In Mo Yang (South Korea)
 2nd Prize: Fumika Mohri (Japan)
 3rd Prize: Albrecht Menzel (Germany)
 4th Prize: Diana Pasko (Russia)
 5th Prize: Elly Suh (US/South Korea)
 6th Prize: Dainis Medjaniks (Latvia)
 Prize in memory of Dr. Enrico Costa: In Mo Yang
 Prize in memory of Renato De Barbieri: Tan Yabing (China)
 Prize in memory of Mario Ruminelli: In Mo Yang
 Friends of the Nuovo Carlo Felice Association prize: In Mo Yang

LV Edition - 2018 
 1st Prize: Kevin Zhu (US)
 2nd Prize: Fedor Rudin (France)
 3rd Prize: Stephen Kim (US)
 4th Prize: Yiliang Jiang (China)
 5th Prize: Oleksandr Pusharenko (Ukraine)
 6th Prize: Luke Hsu (US)
 Prize in memory of Dr. Enrico Costa: Kevin Zhu
 Prize in memory of Renato De Barbieri: Kevin Zhu
 Prize in memory of Mario Ruminelli: Fedor Rudin
 Prize in memory of Stefano Fiorilla: Kevin Zhu
 Prize of the Associazione Culturale Musica con le Ali: Rennosuke Fukuda (Japan)

Video recordings
2006 PREMIO PAGANINI INTERNATIONAL VIOLIN COMPETITION (documentary) - Orchestra Teatro Carlo Felice di Genova, DVD Dynamic Cat. 33539 - 105 Min.

See also
 List of classical music competitions
 World Federation of International Music Competitions

References

Sources
 Large portions of the above information was directly brought over from the Italian Wikipedia
 Paganini Competition official website

Niccolò Paganini
Music competitions in Italy
Violin competitions